Meant to Be Mint is the debut studio album of R&B band Mint Condition. The album was released on June 11, 1991, on Jimmy Jam & Terry Lewis' A&M imprint Perspective Records. Meant to Be Mint reached to  no. 13 on the Top R&B/Hip-Hop Albums chart.

Overview
Released during the height of the new jack swing era, Mint Condition's debut was more in tune with the sounds of the time. The album was also produced by The Time drummer Jellybean Johnson.

The album's first single, "Are You Free", reached number 55 on the Hot R&B Songs chart. Their second single, "Breakin' My Heart (Pretty Brown Eyes)", reached nos. 3 & 6 on the Billboard Hot R&B Songs and Hot 100 charts respectively. Another album cut, "Forever in Your Eyes", reached no. 7 on the Hot R&B Songs chart.

Track listing

Personnel
 Stokley Williams - lead vocals, drums, drum programming, keyboards, bass synth, rhythm & vocal arrangement
 Keri Lewis - keyboards, drum programming, percussion, rhythm & vocal arrangement
 O'Dell - rhythm guitar, lead guitar, keyboards, drum programming, percussion, vocal arrangement
 Lawrence Waddell - grand piano, keyboards, keyboard solos
 Jeffrey Allen - saxophone, keyboards, keyboard strings
 Ricky Kinchen - bass guitar, electric bass, percussion

Additional personnel
 Terry Lewis - vocal arrangement
 Jellybean Johnson - additional lead guitar
 Lisa Keith - background vocals
 James "Popeye" Greer - background vocals, record engineering
 Dave Rideau - mixing
 Steve Hodge - mixing
 Keith Cohen - mixing
 Brian Gardner - mastering
 Jimmy Jam & Terry Lewis - executive production
 Todd Gray - photography
 Rich Frankel - art direction, design
 Rowan Moore - art direction, design

Charts

Weekly charts

Year-end charts

References

1991 debut albums
Mint Condition (band) albums
Perspective Records albums